This is a list of women who are or have ever been ambassadors of the United States.

List

References

See also 

 Ambassadors of the United States

Ambassadors
Ambassadors
Ambassadors,United States